Abandoned is an American Reality television series by Picture Shack Entertainment that premiered on the National Geographic Channel on August 22, 2012. It was preceded by a pilot episode that aired on December 30, 2011.

The series follows three men who make a living by scavenging abandoned buildings across America.

Premise 
Jay Chaikin, owner of "Reclaimed Relics", travels around America with his team, Dan Graham and Mark Pakenas, scouring abandoned buildings for relics of America's history that they can refurbish and sell.

Episodes

See also 
 American Pickers, a similar show on History

References 

General references

External links 
 
 Reclaimed Relics website

2011 American television series debuts
2010s American reality television series
National Geographic (American TV channel) original programming
2012 American television series endings